Marcus Kristoffersson (born January 22, 1979) is a Swedish professional ice hockey right winger currently playing for HC ’05 Banská Bystrica in the Slovak Extraliga. He played in the Elitserien for HV71, Djurgårdens IF and Skellefteå AIK and has also played in the Finnish SM-liiga for Blues and Ässät, the American Hockey League for the Utah Grizzlies, the Italian Serie A for SG Cortina and the English Premier Ice Hockey League for the Manchester Phoenix. He was drafted 105th overall in the 1997 NHL Entry Draft by the Dallas Stars.

External links

1979 births
Living people
Ässät players
Dallas Stars draft picks
Djurgårdens IF Hockey players
Espoo Blues players
HV71 players
Malmö Redhawks players
Manchester Phoenix players
Mora IK players
Örebro HK players
SG Cortina players
Skellefteå AIK players
Swedish ice hockey right wingers
Utah Grizzlies (AHL) players
People from Östersund
Sportspeople from Jämtland County